Metter High School is a high school in Metter in rural Candler County. It serves grades 9 through 12.

Historic building
The school's old building, at the junction of College Street and Vertia Street, about four blocks away from the current building, was constructed in 1910.  It was designed in Classical Revival style by architect C.C. Muse.  A new classroom building was built across College Street in 1937, after which the old building was used less and less.  The old building was added to the National Register of Historic Places in 2002.

The former school is a two-story building with a full-height, pedimented portico supported by four Doric columns and two brick pilasters.  It originally provided education from grade 1 through grade 11 for the white students of the area.

After 1937, a kitchen and lunchroom in a former classroom area were used until about 1955.  Vocational training including industrial arts and business classes continued in the old building for many years.  It was later used primarily for storage. In 2017, it became home to the Candler County Historical Society Museum.

Notable alumni

 LaVon Mercer (born 1959), American-Israeli basketball player

See also
 National Register of Historic Places listings in Candler County, Georgia

References

External links
 
 Candler County School District website

Education in Candler County, Georgia
School buildings on the National Register of Historic Places in Georgia (U.S. state)
Buildings and structures in Candler County, Georgia
National Register of Historic Places in Candler County, Georgia
High schools in Georgia (U.S. state)